Ladislav is a Czech, Slovak and Croatian variant of the Slavic name Vladislav. The female form of this name is Ladislava.

Folk etymology occasionally links Ladislav with the Slavic goddess Lada.

Spellings and variations 

László is a Hungarian variation of this name.

Athletes 

Ladislav Beneš, Czechoslovak Olympic handball player
Ladislav Benýšek, Czech ice hockey player
Ladislav Čepčianský, Czechoslovak sprint canoer
Ladislav Dluhoš, Czechoslovak ski jumper
Ladislav Fouček
Ladislav Hecht (1909–2004), Czechoslovak/American tennis player 
Ladislav Hrubý, cross-country skier
Ladislav Jurkemik, Czechoslovak/Slovak footballer and manager
Ladislav Kačáni, Czechoslovak footballer and coach
Ladislav Kohn, Czech ice hockey player
Ladislav Kuna, Czechoslovak footballer
Ladislav Lubina, Czechoslovak ice hockey player and coach
Ladislav Maier, Czech footballer
Ladislav Nagy, Slovak ice hockey player
Ladislav Novák, Czechoslovak footballer
Ladislav Pataki, Czechoslovak/American coach and sports scientist
Ladislav Pavlovič, Czechoslovak footballer
Ladislav Petráš, Czechoslovak footballer
Ladislav Prášil, Czech shot putter
Ladislav Rybánsky, Slovak footballer
Ladislav Rygl, Jr., Czech Nordic combined Olympic skier
Ladislav Rygl, Sr., Czechoslovak Nordic combined Olympic skier
Ladislav Ščurko, Slovak ice hockey player and confessed murderer
Ladislav Šimůnek, Czechoslovak footballer
Ladislav Škorpil, Czech football manager
Ladislav Šmíd, Czech ice hockey player
Ladislav Švanda, Czech Olympic cross country skier
Ladislav Troják, Czechoslovak ice hockey player
Ladislav Trpkoš, Czechoslovak Olympic basketball player
Ladislav Vácha, Czechoslovak Olympic gymnast
Ladislav Vízek, Czechoslovak footballer
Ladislav Volešák, Czech footballer

Politicians 
Ladislav Adamec, Czechoslovak Prime Minister, Communist politician
Ladislav Miko, Czech politician and expert on environmental issues
Ladislav Pejačević, Croatian politician, Ban of Croatia

Scientists 
Ladislav Brožek, Slovak astronomer
Ladislav František Čelakovský, Czech mycologist and botanist
Ladislav Josef Čelakovský, Czech botanist
Ladislav Mucina, Slovak botanist, ecologist, and vegetation expert

Writers and artists 
Ladislav Bublík (1924-1988), Czech writer
Ladislav Fialka, Czechoslovak mime
Ladislav Fuks, Czechoslovak novelist
Ladislav "Ladi" Geisler, Czechoslovak musician
Ladislav Klíma, Czech philosopher and novelist
Ladislav Kralj, Croatian painter and engraver
Ladislav Kubík, Czechoslovak/American composer
Ladislav Kupkovič, Czechoslovak composer and conductor
Ladislav Mňačko, Czechoslovak writer and journalist
Ladislav Mráz, Czechoslovak opera singer
Ladislav Nádaši-Jégé, Slovak writer, literary critic, and doctor
Ladislav Šaloun, Czechoslovak sculptor
Ladislav Slovák, Czechoslovak conductor
Ladislav Smoček, Czech playwright and theater director
Ladislav Smoljak, Czechoslovak film and theater director
Ladislav Stroupežnický, Austro-Hungarian/Czech author, playwright, and director
Ladislav Vycpálek, Czechoslovak composer and violinist

Others 
Ladislav Hudec, Austro-Hungarian/Slovak architect
Ladislav Kovács, Slovak Professional Counter-Strike: Global Offensive player
Ladislav Prokeš, Czechoslovak chess master and composer of endgame studies
Ladislav Žák, Czechoslovak architect and painter
Ladislav Zgusta, Czechoslovak linguist, historian and theorist of lexicography

See also

 Ladislao
 Ladislaus (disambiguation)
 László
 Volodyslav - Ukrainian spelling of Володислав - Владислав
 Vladislav
 Włodzisław, Duke of Lendians
 Slavic names

Czech masculine given names
Slovak masculine given names
Slavic masculine given names
Masculine given names